Kista is a district in the borough of Rinkeby-Kista, Stockholm, Sweden. It has a strategic position located in between Sweden's main airport, the Stockholm-Arlanda International Airport and central Stockholm, and alongside the main national highway E4 economic artery. Kista comprises residential and commercial areas, the latter in the highly technological telecommunication and information technology industry. There are large research efforts in this entire area, which therefore is dubbed Kista Science City. It is the research park of KTH Royal Institute of Technology.

Kista is the largest Information and Communications Technology (ICT) cluster in Europe, and was ranked the world's second largest cluster after Silicon Valley in California during the internet boom of 2000. It is the largest corporate area in Sweden, important to the national economy due to the presence of, among others, Ericsson Group, one of the largest corporations in Sweden.

Kista Science City is the location where a large portion of the research and development of the world's 4G LTE mobile telephony infrastructure is being developed, a European ETSI standard used worldwide and Kista Science City has been the largest such cluster in Europe for decades. A majority is done at Ericsson corporation, with 100,000 employees worldwide, but with its research and worldwide headquarters in the Kista Science City.

Kista was named after an old farm "Kista Gård", still located in the area. The construction of the modern parts were started in the 1970s. Most of the streets in Kista are named after towns and places in Denmark, Iceland, Greenland, and Faroe Islands. Before the opening of the Mall of Scandinavia, Kista Galleria was the biggest shopping center in the Stockholm region. 
Because of its ICT industries, it became in the 1980s referred to as "Chipsta" and, after Sweden joined the EU in 1995, also as Europe's "Silicon Valley".

Economy 
Kista is the largest corporate area in Sweden and important to the national economy.
The construction of the industrial section of Kista began in the 1970s with companies such as SRA (Svenska Radioaktiebolaget, now a part of Ericsson), RIFA AB (later Ericsson Components AB, and later still Ericsson Microelectronics AB, and now Infineon Technologies), and IBM Svenska AB (the Swedish branch of IBM). Ericsson has had its headquarters in Kista since 2003.

Research and higher learning 

Kista hosts entire departments of both KTH Royal Institute of Technology, such as Wireless@KTH, and Stockholm University (formerly jointly known as "the IT University").

There are also Swedish national research institutes (pure research, no students) such as the Swedish Institute of Computer Science and Swedish Defence Research Agency, FOI who has its headquarters there, just as Ericsson,  Swedish IBM and Tele 2, among others has.

Also the Swedish Co-location Centre of EU innovation and entrepreneurial education organisation EIT Digital is located in Kista and offers a 2-year Master program in collaboration with KTH Royal Institute of Technology.

Gallery

See also 
 Kista Science Tower
 Kista metro station

References

External links 
Kista Science City
Kista Business Network

Districts in Västerort
Metropolitan Stockholm
High-technology business districts